Dylan John McGowan (born 6 August 1991) is an Australian professional footballer who plays as a defender for Hamilton Academical, on loan from Kilmarnock.

Early life
McGowan was born in Adelaide into a Scottish family from Glasgow. He is the brother of fellow footballer Ryan McGowan.

Club career

Hearts
McGowan signed for Hearts in 2008 from Para Hills Knights.

Following his loan spells McGowan returned to Hearts. McGowan made his debut for the club coming on as substitute for Mehdi Taouil in the 84th minutes, in a 3–0 win over Dundee United on 22 September 2012. In a 0–0 draw against Hibernian on 4 January 2013, McGowan drew praise from Manager John McGlynn for a good display, including stopping striker Leigh Griffiths. McGowan started at right back when Hearts lost 3–2 to St Mirren in the Scottish League Cup Final. McGowan signed a new one-year contract, having started negotiations in January.

McGowan made the switch from the number 74 shirt for number 5 following the departure of Darren Barr. He made a good start when he provided a cross to Callum Paterson to make it 1–0 against Hibernian, which Hearts won on 11 August 2013. McGowan was an ever present in the team making thirty-seven appearances at the end of the 2013–14 season, With the club in administration McGowan along with other experienced players were released by the club upon expiry of his contract.

Loan Spell
On 16 November 2011, McGowan joined Scottish Second Division side East Fife on loan. He made his debut on 20 November, as a substitute in their 3–1 victory over Forfar in the Scottish Cup, with his league debut coming on 14 December 2010 in a 6–0 win over Stenhousemuir. On 19 April, he scored his first goal for the club scoring the opening goal in their 3–2 win over Brechin City. In all he made 25 appearances in all competitions for East Fife, scoring one goal. Manager John Robertson was interviewed after the season on gaining McGowan services for the following season, but said  at our level he's too good.

In June 2011, McGowan joined A-League franchise Gold Coast United on a season long loan. He made his debut on the opening day of the season on 9 October against Wellington Phoenix.

Adelaide United
In June 2014, McGowan returned to his hometown, signing with Adelaide United on a two-year contract. Dylan made his debut for Adelaide United in the FFA Cup in the round of 32 against the Wellington Phoenix.

He scored his first goal against rivals Melbourne victory in round 22 of the 2014/15 season.

McGowan scored an extra time winner against Sydney FC to send Adelaide United to the quarterfinal of the FFA Cup on 27 August 2015.

McGowan signed a new one-year contract with Adelaide United on 7 June 2016.

Paços Ferreira 
McGowan signed a two-year contract with Portuguese club Paços Ferreira on 16 May 2017.

Loan to Gangwon 
In January 2018, McGowan moved to K League 1 side Gangwon on loan.

Western Sydney Wanderers
On 22 August 2019, McGowan signed with the Western Sydney Wanderers on a three-year contract. During pre-season training he injured Radosław Majewski with a poor tackle, causing a cruciate ligament injury that stopped Majewski from ever playing for the club again. Majewski later claimed the incident was deliberate, which McGowan denied at the time. McGowan was made the club Captain for the season. He agreed a mutual contract termination with the club in July 2021, having played 2 seasons at the Wanderers with 41 league appearances. The team failed to qualify for the A-League finals series in either season.

Kilmarnock
After leaving Australia, McGowan returned to Scotland, signing a two-year deal with Kilmarnock.

Loan to Hamilton Academical 
On 7 January 2023, McGowan joined Scottish Championship club Hamilton Academical on loan until the end of the season. On the same day, McGowan would lead the side out as captain on his debut away to Ayr United.

International career
McGowan has been capped 28 times and has scored 4 for the Australia U-20 side and was a member of the team that finished runners-up in the 2010 AFC U-19 Championship and the U/20 World Cup in Colombia. He has been capped by the Australia U/23 team twice.

Career statistics

Honours 

 Adelaide United
 FFA Cup: 2014
 A-League Championship: 2015–16
 A-League Premiership: 2015–16

 Kilmarnock
 Scottish Championship: 2021–22

 Australia U20
 AFF U-19 Youth Championship: 2010

References

External links
	

1991 births
Living people
Soccer players from Adelaide
Australian people of Scottish descent
Australian soccer players
Australia international soccer players
Association football central defenders
Heart of Midlothian F.C. players
East Fife F.C. players
Gold Coast United FC players
Adelaide United FC players
F.C. Paços de Ferreira players
Gangwon FC players
Western Sydney Wanderers FC players
Kilmarnock F.C. players
Scottish Football League players
A-League Men players
Scottish Premier League players
Scottish Professional Football League players
Expatriate footballers in Portugal
Australian expatriate sportspeople in Portugal
Australian expatriate soccer players
Australia under-20 international soccer players
2017 FIFA Confederations Cup players
Hamilton Academical F.C. players